Esmatabad or Ismatabad may refer to:
 Esmatabad, Kerman
 Esmatabad, Qazvin
 Esmatabad, Razavi Khorasan
 Esmatabad, Quchan, Razavi Khorasan Province
 Esmatabad, Tehran
 Esmatabad, Mehriz, Yazd Province
 Esmatabad, Taft, Taft Province